The Judo competition at the 2010 Summer Youth Olympics took place between 21–25 August in Singapore. There were a total of eight weight categories for both Boys and Girls.

Competition schedule

Medal summary

Medal table

Boys' Events

Girls' Events

Team Event

References

 Official Site

External links
 

 
2010 Summer Youth Olympics events
Youth Olympics
2010
Judo competitions in Singapore